Albert is a 1985 Czechoslovak film directed by František Vláčil. It is based on a short story by Lev Nikolaevic Tolstoj. Vláčil made the film for Slovak television. It has won an award at Tokyo International Film Festival. Vláčil's health was poor at the time of shooting which led to many difficulties.

Cast
 Jaroslav Filip as Albert
 Jan Kačer as hrabě Delesov
 Peter Debnár as sluha Zachar
 Zora Kolínska as Anna Ivanovna
 Elena Kucháriková
 Ivan Romančík
 František Rebarbora
 Jiří Menzel

References

External links
 

1985 drama films
1980s historical films
1985 films
1980s Czech-language films
Slovak-language films
Czechoslovak drama films
Films directed by František Vláčil
Slovak television films